Ashinsky (masculine), Ashinskaya (feminine), or Ashinskoye (neuter) may refer to:
Ashinsky District, a district of Chelyabinsk Oblast, Russia
Ashinskoye Urban Settlement, a municipal formation which the Town of Asha in Ashinsky District of Chelyabinsk Oblast, Russia is incorporated as
Ashinsky (rural locality), a rural locality (a village) in Iglinsky District of the Republic of Bashkortostan, Russia